Naundorf bei Seyda is a village and a former municipality in the district of Wittenberg, in Saxony-Anhalt, Germany. Since 1 January 2010, it is part of the town Jessen.

Geography
Naundorf bei Seyda lies about 17 km northeast of Lutherstadt Wittenberg in the Fläming.

Naundorf bei Seyda has a subdivision: Mark Friedersdorf.

History
The community had its first documentary mention in 1459.

Economy and transportation
Federal Highway (Bundesstraße) B 2 between Berlin and Wittenberg lies 12 km west of the community.

References

Former municipalities in Saxony-Anhalt
Jessen (Elster)